| tries               = {{#expr: 

+ 8 + 4 +  4 + 10 + 12 + 1 + 3 + 7 +  5 +  5 + 5 + 5
+ 4 + 4 +  7 + 12 +  6 + 8 + 3 + 8 + 12 + 15 + 5 + 9
+ 4 + 4 + 11 +  5 +  3 + 3 + 3 + 8 +  9 + 11 + 9 + 6
+ 4 + 5 +  6 +  7 +  9 + 2 + 2 + 5 + 12 +  3 + 9 + 4
+ 4 + 5 +  4 +  5 +  9 + 9 + 4 + 6 +  5 + 11 + 7 + 5
+ 2 + 7 +  2 +  6 +  8 + 1 + 6 + 7 +  1 +  5 + 5 + 3
+ 8 + 7 +  8 +  2 +  4 + 8 + 7
}}
| top point scorer    = Cathal Marsh (Leinster A)(100 points)
| top try scorer      = Aaron Warren (Llanelli)(9 tries)
| venue               = Donnybrook
| attendance2         = 1,400
| champions           =  Leinster A 
| count               = 2
| runner-up           =  Leeds Carnegie
| website             = 
| previous year       = 2012–13
| previous tournament = 2012–13 British and Irish Cup
| next year           = 2014–15
| next tournament     = 2014–15 British and Irish Cup
}}

The 2013–14 British and Irish Cup was the fifth season of the annual rugby union competition for second tier, semi-professional clubs from Britain and Ireland.  Leinster A were the defending champions having won the 2012–13 Final with a 78th minute penalty by Noel Reid to beat Newcastle Falcons 18–17 at their home ground Kingston Park. There has been four different winners and four different losing finalists of the competition in the first four seasons of its existence.

The format of the competition has been changed once again, with Welsh participation being reduced to just four teams (down from 12 in the previous season).  The Welsh teams were selected based on regional play-offs involving the 2013–14 Premier Division clubs at the start of the season.  This process yielded Pontypridd to represent the Cardiff Blues Region, Cross Keys to represent the Dragons Region, Aberavon to represent the Ospreys Region, and Llanelli to represent the Scarlets Region.

Matches in the competition proper were played on the same weekends as the Heineken Cup and European Challenge Cup.  First round matches began on 11 October 2013 and the final was held on 23 May 2014.  Leinster A beat Leeds Carnegie 44 – 17 in the final and retained the cup they won in the previous season – the first team to win the cup for a second time.

Teams
The allocation of teams was as follows:
 – 12 clubs from RFU Championship
 – 4 Irish provinces represented by 'A' teams
 – 4 top clubs from the Scottish Premiership
 – 4 clubs from the Welsh Premier Division

Welsh qualification
Welsh participation was reduced from 12 teams (in the previous season) to just four.  The Welsh teams were selected based on regional play-offs involving the 2013–14 Premier Division clubs at the start of the season. Teams gained home advantage depending upon their finishing position at the end of the 2012–13 season.  For example, in the Cardiff Blues region, Cardiff RFC (8th in the 2012-13 Welsh Premier Division) traveled to Sardis Road to play Pontypridd RFC (1st). Likewise, Llanelli RFC (3rd) hosted Carmarthen Quins RFC (6th) with the winner (Llanelli) travelling to Llandovery RFC (2nd) to contest the right to represent the Scarlets region.

Cardiff Blues Region

 The winner of the Cardiff Blues Region, Pontypridd, will play in Pool 2.

Dragons Region

 The winner of the Dragons Region, Cross Keys, will play in Pool 1.

Ospreys Region

 The winner of the Ospreys Region, Aberavon, will play in Pool 5.

Scarlets Region

 The winner of the Scarlets Region, Llanelli, will play in Pool 3.

Competition format 
The competition format is a pool stage followed by a knockout stage.  The pool stage consists of six pools of four teams playing home and away matches.  The top side in each pool, plus the two best runners-up, will progress to the knockout stage.  The eight quarter-finalists will be ranked, with teams ranked 1-4 having home advantage.  The four winning quarter finalists will progress to the semi-final draw. Matches will take place on the same weekends as the Heineken and Amlin Cups.

Pool stages 
The fixture weekends have been announced.

Pool 1 

 This win secured Leinster's qualification to the knock out stages.

Pool 2

Pool 3 

 Rotherham qualified for the knockout stages with this win as their nearest rivals, Llanelli, cannot overtake them.

Pool 4

Pool 5 

 This match was abandoned after 69 minutes when a large hole appeared in the pitch due to a collapsed drain. Bristol were leading 20 – 24 at this point.  The match was ordered to be replayed at Talbot Athletic Ground before the conclusion of the pool stages on a date suitable to both clubs.

Pool 6 

 Cornish Pirates qualified for the knockout stages after this win.

Knock-out stages

Qualifiers
The six pool winners, and the two best runners-up, proceed to the knock out stages.  The ranking criteria of the quarter finalists has been altered slightly from earlier seasons.  Previously, the six pool winners were seeded 1-6 and the two runners up as 7 and 8.  This meant that the best runners-up were automatically ranked 7 and 8 even if they had a better playing record than some of the teams ranked 1–6.  This is no longer the case.

There was a draw for the quarter-final stage, which took place on 27 January 2014.  The top four seeds (Leinster A, Leeds Carnegie, Cornish Pirates and Bristol) will have home advantage.

Teams are ranked by
1. Competition Points (4 for a win, 2 for a draw, etc.)
2. where Competition Points are equal, greatest number of wins
3. where the number of wins are equal, aggregate points difference
4. where the aggregate points difference are equal, greatest number of points scored
There are further criteria that can be applied if necessary.

Quarter-finals
The draw for the quarter-finals was carried out on 27 January 2014.

Semi-finals
The draw for the semi-finals was carried out on 27 January 2014.

 Leinster won on tries scored.

Final
On 14 April, it was announced that the final will be played at the home of the winner of the Pontypridd / Leinster A semi-final.  This will be played on Friday 23 May, at a time to be decided.

Top scorers

Top points scorers

Top try scorers

Geography

Notes

Notes

References

External links 
  Unofficial British and Irish Cup website - latest news, teams etc

British and Irish Cup
2013–14 rugby union tournaments for clubs
2013–14 RFU Championship
2013–14 in Irish rugby union
2013–14 in Welsh rugby union
2013–14 in Scottish rugby union
2013–14 in British rugby union